HCK may refer to:
 HCK, an enzyme that in humans is encoded by the HCK gene
 HC Keski-Uusimaa, a Finnish ice hockey team based in Kerava
 Windows HCK (Hardware Certification Kit), an earlier released framework of Windows HLK (Hardware Lab Kit)